Mesón Group is a Cambrian to Early Ordovician sedimentary formation located in the Argentine Northwest and nearby parts of Bolivia. The group members rest unconformably on top of the Ediacaran–Cambrian Puncoviscana Formation. According to G.F. Aceñolaza, the Mesón Basin the sedimentary basin in which the Méson Group was deposited was located between the Arequipa and Río de la Plata Cratons.

Stratigraphy 
The Mesón Group comprises three formations: Chahualmayoc Formation at the top, Lizoite Formation at the base and Campanario Formation in-between. The group is composed of sandstones, siltstones and limestones.

Fossil content 
The group has provided fossils of:

Trilobites
 Asaphellus sp.
 Notopeltis sp.

Other
 Macrocystella sp.

References

Further reading 
 F. G. Acenolaza. 1986. El genero Macrocystella (Cystoidea) en el Tremadociano de Salta y Jujuy. Actas del IV congreso Argentino de paleontologia y bioestratigrafia - Simposio: Bioestratigrafia del Paleozoico Inferior. Ed. A. Cuerda. 1:133-137

Geologic groups of South America
Geologic formations of Argentina
Geologic formations of Bolivia
Ordovician System of South America
Cambrian System of South America
Ordovician Argentina
Ordovician Bolivia
Cambrian Argentina
Cambrian Bolivia
Tremadocian
Sandstone formations
Shale formations
Limestone formations
Shallow marine deposits
Cambrian southern paleotemperate deposits
Ordovician southern paleotemperate deposits
Fossiliferous stratigraphic units of South America
Paleontology in Argentina
Paleontology in Bolivia
Geology of Jujuy Province
Geology of Salta Province
Geology of Tucumán Province
Formations